Jacky Kok Jing Hong (Chinese: 郭景宏; born 12 March 2002) is a Malaysian badminton player.

Career 
He made his first debut in the Jakarta Open Junior International U-15, he was selected for the badminton team of Bukit Jalil Sports School and was promoted to the national team at the age of 18.

In January 2022, he competed in the Swedish Open and won his first international title in the final by defeating compatriot Yeoh Seng Zoe by walkover. Before that, he managed to advance to the final at the Estonian International tournament, but lost to France's Alex Lanier. He was one of the players that earned Malaysia their first gold medal in the 2022 Badminton Asia Team Championships.

Achievements

BWF International Challenge/Series (1 title, 1 runner-up) 
Men's singles

  BWF International Series tournament

References

External links 
 

2002 births
Living people
People from Kedah
Malaysian sportspeople of Chinese descent
Malaysian male badminton players
Competitors at the 2021 Southeast Asian Games
Southeast Asian Games silver medalists for Malaysia
Southeast Asian Games medalists in badminton
21st-century Malaysian people